Mike Baumgartner (April 20, 1922 – July 22, 1991) was an American bobsledder. He competed in the four-man event at the 1964 Winter Olympics.

References

1922 births
1991 deaths
American male bobsledders
Olympic bobsledders of the United States
Bobsledders at the 1964 Winter Olympics
Sportspeople from Perth Amboy, New Jersey